Tebeosfera is an electronic journal devoted to the study of the media related to the graphic popular culture in Spanish, including comic, cartoon, illustration, pulp novels, cinema or videogames. The founder and director is Manuel Barrero, the assistant director is Javier Alcázar and the coordinating editor is Félix López. The journal uses double-blind peer review, has a scientific committee and is indexed by Latindex, DOAJ, REDIB, DRJI and ERIH PLUS. Its ISSN is 1579-2811.

References

External links

Magazines about comics
Comics scholars
Spanish-language journals